Kinneloa Mesa is an unincorporated community located in Los Angeles County, California, with a population of 1,070 as of 2000.  Unlike Altadena, a larger unincorporated area nearby, Kinneloa Mesa is not an official census-designated place.  According to the Los Angeles Times, the population was counted in the 2000 census and the area is considered "unincorporated Pasadena". Kinneloa Mesa is in the Los Angeles County list of unincorporated areas and street maps, including those of the Los Angeles County Assessor's office which recognize Kinneloa Mesa Road and Kinneloa Canyon Road as the area's two principal roads.

Kinneloa Mesa is an unincorporated community of the Fifth Supervisorial District of Los Angeles County.  It is bordered by the San Gabriel Mountains and the Angeles National Forest to the north and the city of Pasadena around the rest of its perimeter; it is also near Altadena, across the Eaton Canyon wash, and Sierra Madre, across an intervening fingertip section of Pasadena.

History 
The streets on Kinneloa Mesa were created and named by the founder of the Kinneloa Mesa community Mr. Abbot Kinney. The name "Kinneloa" meaning "Kinney's Hill" in Hawaii was later used to create the street names in a Hawaiian fashion, (Mesaloa, Meyerloa, Lindaloa). The street name Clarmeya was named for the two original residents of Kinneloa Mesa, the Clarks and the Meyers. And as you are driving down the Kinneloa Mesa hill the mountain range resembles a Hawaiian mountain, which inspired the Hawaiian names.

According to Altadena web-historians, Kinneloa Mesa may comprise part or all of the ranch of Abbot Kinney, and has also been known as the Kinneloa Estates.

In 1993, the Kinneloa Fire, begun accidentally on the slopes above Eaton Canyon, burned dozens of homes in Kinneloa Mesa and neighboring Altadena as part of a rash of late October wildfires driven by Santa Ana winds in Southern California. One man died of complications from smoke inhalation and dozens were injured.

News stories that reference Kinneloa Mesa occasionally misspell Kinneloa as "Kinneola" creating difficulty in researching current and historical events for this area.

References

Sources 
"Burning Concerns; New Mexico 'Controlled' Fire Puts Local Officials on Defensive", by Lee Condon. Los Angeles Times. Los Angeles, Calif.: May 21, 2000, page 1.
"Cold Front Puts the Chill on Ill Winds; Weather: Alaskan storm system blocks return of powerful Santa Ana winds." by Dexter Filkins, Eric Malnic. Los Angeles Times. Los Angeles, Calif.: Oct 27, 1996, page 1.
"Californians Set For More Wind And New Blazes; But a Day of Calm Lets Firefighters Catch Up", by Robert Reinhold. New York Times, New York, N.Y.: Oct 30, 1993, page 6. 
"Transient's Act Means Others Now Homeless", by Deborah Hastings. The Associated Press. Orange County Register. Santa Ana, Calif.: Oct 29, 1993, page A24.
"A Drive in January", by Clara Spalding Brown. Ballou's Monthly Magazine. Boston, Mass.: July to December, 1883, page 62.
"The Plateau of Sierra Madre", by Charles F. Lummis. The Land of Sunshine: A Southwestern Magazine. Los Angeles, Calif.: December, 1895, to, May, 1896, page 193.

External links 
Los Angeles County's Unincorporated Areas
The official Timeline of Altadena History

Unincorporated communities in Los Angeles County, California
Altadena, California
Geography of Pasadena, California
Communities in the San Gabriel Valley
San Gabriel Mountains
Unincorporated communities in California